Potaro-Siparuni (Region 8) is a region of Guyana. Venezuela claims the majority of the Region located west of the Essequibo River as part of Guayana Esequiba.

It borders the region of Cuyuni-Mazaruni to the north, the regions of Upper Demerara-Berbice and East Berbice-Corentyne to the east, the region of Upper Takutu-Upper Essequibo to the south and Brazil to the west.

The main villages in the region are Campbelltown, Orinduik, Mahdia, Paramakatoi and Tumatumari.

Population
The Government of Guyana has administered three official censuses since the 1980 administrative reforms, in 1980, 1991 and 2002.  In 2012, the population of Potaro-Siparuni was recorded at 10,190 people. Official census records for the population of Potaro-Siparuni are as follows:

2012 : 10,190
2002 : 10,095
1991 : 5,616
1980 : 4,485

Communities
(including name variants):

Arnik Village
Campbelltown
Itabac
Kamana Village
Kanapang Village
Kato (Kato Village, Karto)
Kopinang Mission
Mahdia
Micobie
Monkey Mountain
Orinduik
Paramakatoi (Paramahatoi)
Potaro Landing
Taruka
Tumatumari
Tumatumari Landing
Waipa Village

See also
 Amaila Falls
 Kaieteur National Park

References

 
Regions of Guyana